Mustafa Çelebi (d. May 1422), also called Mustafa the Impostor ( or Düzme Mustafa), was an Ottoman prince who struggled to gain the throne of the Ottoman Empire in the early 15th century. He was the Sultan of Rumelia twice during January 1419 – 1420 and January 1421 – May 1422.

Background 

Mustafa was one of the sons of Bayezid I, the Ottoman sultan. His mother was Devletşah Hatun, the daughter of Süleyman Şah of Germiyanids and Mutahhara Abide Hatun bint-i Sultan Veled bin Mawlānā Jalal al-Din Muhammad Rumi. After the Battle of Ankara in which his father Bayezid was defeated by Timurlane, Mustafa as well as Bayezid himself was taken as a prisoner of war. While his four brothers were fighting each other during the Ottoman Interregnum, he was held captive in Samarkand (in modern-day Uzbekistan). After the death of Timurlane, he returned to Anatolia in 1405 and hid himself in the territories of the Turkish beyliks.

First rebellion 
After the interregnum, from which his brother sultan Mehmed I had emerged victorious, Mustafa appeared in Rumelia (the European portion of the Ottoman Empire) with the help of Byzantine emperor Manuel II Palaiologos. He also had the support of Mircea I of Wallachia and Cüneyt Bey, the ruler of the Turkish Aydinid beylik. Mustafa asked Mehmet I, who had recently defeated his other claimant brothers, to partition the empire with him. Mehmet refused this request and easily defeated Mustafa's forces in battle. Mustafa took refuge in the Byzantine city of Thessaloniki in 1416. After reaching an agreement with Mehmet, the Byzantine emperor Manuel exiled him to the island of Lemnos.

Second rebellion 
After the death of Mehmet I in 1421, Mustafa felt that he could easily defeat his nephew Murad II, Mehmet's son and successor. With the help of the Byzantines, he captured Gelibolu, the fort which controlled the strait of the Dardanelles, and after capturing Edirne, the European capital of the empire, he began ruling in Rumeli. Next, he proved that he was indeed Bayezid's son and gained the support of the Ottoman provincial governors in Rumeli. Although Murad sent troops over the strait of Bosphorous to defeat Mustafa, even these troops joined his forces in the Battle of Sazlıdere. Growing overconfident in his abilities, Mustafa decided to cross the Dardanelles and complete his conquest of the Asian side of the empire in Anatolia.

However, in Anatolia, Mihaloğlu (a descendant of Köse Mihal), a partisan of Murad who was very famous in Rumeli, encouraged Mustafa's allies to betray him and support Murad instead. Furthermore, some of Mustafa's allies, notably Cüneyt Bey, abandoned him. Mustafa gave up his hopes to conquer Anatolia and escaped to Rumeli, with Murad's forces in pursuit. To cross the strait of the Dardanelles after Mustafa, Murad asked for the help of Genoan vessels, for which he paid an exorbitant price. Murad's forces soon caught up with Mustafa and captured him.

Execution and aftermath 
Mustafa was sentenced to death and was hanged in 1422. Although inter-dynasty executions were common in the Ottoman dynasty, hanging was not the usual treatment for a dynasty member; more "dignified" execution methods were normally used. It is thought that Murad wanted to send the message that Mustafa was not his genuine uncle (although he was) but an impostor. Thus, contemporary Ottoman historians called him düzmece Mustafa. Aşıkpaşazade mentions  that Mustafa was brought by crawling to the execution place, and that he wanted to say something to Murad, but was hanged without even being given the opportunity.

It is also mentioned that one of his sons was held hostage by the Byzantine emperor, but there is no information about his fate. There were also claims that Mustafa Çelebi managed to escape to Wallachia, then to Cafa, and then returned to Thessaloniki where he participated in the long siege of the city on the side of the Venetian defenders. Meantime, another Düzme Mustafa was unearthed by Venice, claimed to be the son of Bayezid, and that collaborated with the Venetian navy in the spring of 1425.

Legacy
His silver coins struck in Edirne dating 824 AH (1421 AD), and the copper coins minted in Serres have survived to this day.

References

15th-century people from the Ottoman Empire
1422 deaths
Executed people from the Ottoman Empire
Ottoman princes
Executed Turkish people
15th-century executions by the Ottoman Empire
Pretenders to the Ottoman throne
Date of birth unknown